Clinidium baldufi is a species of ground beetle in the subfamily Rhysodinae. It was described by R.T. Bell in 1970. It is endemic to the central and eastern United States, east of central Iowa, southeastern Missouri and southwestern Mississippi, as far south as northern Florida, and north to northern Illinois, Pennsylvania, and New Jersey.

Clinidium baldufi measure  in length.

References

Clinidium
Beetles of the United States
Endemic fauna of the United States
Beetles described in 1970